The striped marlin (Kajikia audax) is a species of marlin found in tropical to temperate Indo-Pacific oceans not far from the surface. It is a desirable commercial and game fish. The striped marlin is a predator that hunts during the day in the top 100 m or so of the water column, often near the surface. One of their chief prey is sardines.

Description  
The striped marlin consists of 42-48 rays on its tall first dorsal fin that is almost the same or longer than its body depth while the second dorsal fin is much smaller. They have torpedo-like and compressed bodies. They have around 12-20 clear, visible bluish stripes on the sides of their bodies even after death. The color of their bodies is dark blue or black above and silvery-white on the bottom.

Life Cycle  
They can live up to at least 10 years.

Diet   
The striped marlin is a top predator that mainly feeds on a wide range of fish, such as Sardine, Mackerel, small Tuna, Mahi-Mahi and Cephalopod. One such study off the coast of Mexico has found that it mostly feeds on schooling fish such as Chub mackerel, Etrumeus sadina and Sardinops caeruleus and Squid, mostly the Jumbo Squid, .

Sustainable consumption 
In 2010, Greenpeace International added the striped marlin to its red seafood list.

Fisheries

References

Further reading
 
 Tony Ayling & Geoffrey Cox, Collins Guide to the Sea Fishes of New Zealand,  (William Collins Publishers Ltd, Auckland, New Zealand 1982) 

Kajikia
Fish of Hawaii
Fish described in 1887